Richard Hill may refer to:

Politicians
 Richard Hill of Hawkstone (1655–1727), English diplomat and protector of the Vaudois
 Richard Hill (Pennsylvania politician) (died 1729), mayor of Philadelphia, Pennsylvania
 Sir Richard Hill, 2nd Baronet (1732–1808), English religious revivalist and politician
 Richard Noel-Hill, 4th Baron Berwick (1774–1848), British peer
 Richard Hill (New South Wales politician) (1810–1895), member of the New South Wales Legislative Assembly
 Richard Hill (Queensland politician) (1885–1959), member of the Queensland Legislative Assembly
 Richard Hill, 7th Baron Sandys (1931–2013), British landowner and Conservative politician
 Rick Hill (born 1946), U.S. Representative from Montana
 Richard Hill (Jamaica) (1795–1872), mixed-race Jamaican lawyer who campaigned for the rights of free coloureds

Sports

Association football
 Richard Hill (footballer, born 1893) (1893–1971), England international footballer
 Richard Hill (footballer, born 1963), former Northampton Town F.C. and Watford F.C. footballer
 Ricky Hill (born 1959), English footballer and manager

Rugby union
 Richard Hill (rugby union, born 1961) (born 1961), played scrum-half for Bath and England, and later coached Gloucester, Bristol, and Worcester
 Richard Hill (rugby union, born 1973) (born 1973), played flanker for Saracens, England and the British and Irish Lions

Other sports
 Richard Hill (runner), English middle-distance runner
 Richard Hill (cricketer, born 1861) (1861–1924), Somerset cricketer
 Richard Hill (cricketer, born 1900) (1900–1959)
 Dick Hill (American football) (born 1934), former American football lineman
 Richard Craig Hill (1934–2012), automobile racer

Others
 Richard Hill (bishop) (died 1496), Bishop of London and Archdeacon of Lewes
 Richard Hill (priest) (1782–1836), Church of England clergyman, born in London, served in Sydney, Australia
 Richard Hill (martyr) (died 1590), Catholic priest and martyr
 Richard Hill (musician) (born 1942), British contemporary composer
 J. Richard Hill (1929–2017), British Royal Navy rear-admiral and author
 Dick Hill (scientist), Canadian cancer researcher
 Dick Hill (narrator), American audiobook narrator
 Richard Hill (RAF officer) (1899–1918), World War I flying ace
 Richard Leslie Hill (1901–1996), English civil servant and historian of Sudan
 Richard Hill (actor), star of the movie Deathstalker

See also
 Richard Hills (disambiguation)
 Richard Burgess (murderer) (1829–1866), born Richard Hill, New Zealander known for the Maungatapu murders
 Rich Hill (disambiguation)